Church of Saint Toros  is an Armenian Orthodox church in the Armenian Quarter of Jerusalem.

History
The Church of St. Toros is located next to St. James' Cathedral. Some 4,000 ancient manuscripts are kept at the church (cf. St. Toros Manuscript Library). This collection of Armenian illustrated manuscripts is the second largest in the world, after one in Armenia. When former Armenian President Levon Ter-Petrosyan visited Israel, the Church of Saint Toros was an important stop on his itinerary.

Thoros, also transliterated as T'oros, is the Armenian equivalent of the name Theodore (Theodoros in Greek).

See also
Armenians in Israel
Christianity in Israel
Armenian church architecture

References

External links
Church of St. Theodore / St. T'oros, Institute for International Urban Development (I2UD): location, history, ground plan and description. Accessed 2021-09-16.

 

Armenian Apostolic churches in Jerusalem